Gong Mun-chol (born 16 August 1967) is a North Korean former footballer. He represented North Korea on at least sixteen occasions between 1992 and 1993.

Career statistics

International

References

1967 births
Living people
North Korean footballers
North Korea international footballers
Association football midfielders
1992 AFC Asian Cup players